Epiodynerus is a monotypic genus of potter wasps. The sole species is Epiodynerus alecto.

References

Potter wasps
Monotypic Hymenoptera genera
Taxa named by Amédée Louis Michel le Peletier